The following television stations operate on virtual channel 7 in Canada:

 CFTF-DT-7 in Sept-Îles, Quebec
 CHAU-DT-6 in Gaspé, Quebec
 CHBC-DT-2 in Vernon, British Columbia
 CHLT-DT in Sherbrooke, Quebec
 CIII-DT-7 in Midland, Ontario
 CISA-DT in Lethbridge, Alberta
 CJDG-DT in Val d'Or, Quebec
 CKRT-DT in Rivière-du-Loup, Quebec
 CKRT-DT-5 in Saint-Urbain, Quebec
 CKY-DT in Winnipeg, Manitoba

07 virtual TV stations in Canada